Coventry Festival may refer to:
 Coventry (Phish festival), 2004 music festival in Coventry, Vermont, USA
 Godiva Festival, annual music festival in Coventry, England
 Coventry UK City of Culture 2021

See also
 Coventry Mystery Plays, medieval religious pageant
 Coventry (disambiguation)